John Homer Cook Jr. (December 19, 1925 – September 17, 1986) was an American football quarterback who played one season with the Regina Roughriders of the Canadian Football League. He was drafted by the Chicago Cardinals in the 23rd round of the 1945 NFL Draft. He played college football at the University of Georgia. Cook died of leukemia in 1986 at the age of 60.

References

External links
Just Sports Stats
College stats
Fanbase profile

1986 deaths
1925 births
Players of American football from Georgia (U.S. state)
American football quarterbacks
Canadian football quarterbacks
American players of Canadian football
Georgia Bulldogs football players
Saskatchewan Roughriders players
People from Cook County, Georgia